Surrealistic Pillow is the second album by the American rock band Jefferson Airplane, released by RCA Victor on February 1, 1967. It is the first album by the band with vocalist Grace Slick and drummer Spencer Dryden. The album peaked at number three on the Billboard album chart and has been certified Platinum by the RIAA. The album is considered to be one of the quintessential works of the early psychedelic rock and 1960s counterculture eras.

"My Best Friend" was released as the first single in December 1966, but reached only #103 on the Billboard Bubbling Under chart. Two singles were released later in the year; "Somebody to Love" and "White Rabbit" peaked respectively at number five and number eight on the Billboard Hot 100 chart and are the band's only Top 40 hits on that chart.

"Today" was not released as a single but was played often on college radio and rock stations and remains one of their most popular songs. It was also recorded by jazz saxophonist Tom Scott for his 1967 album The Honeysuckle Breeze; this version was sampled in the song "They Reminisce Over You" by Pete Rock & C.L. Smooth.

Background

Original drummer Alexander "Skip" Spence left the band in mid-1966. He was soon replaced by Dryden, an experienced Los Angeles jazz drummer and the half-nephew of Charlie Chaplin. New female vocalist Slick, formerly with another San Francisco rock band the Great Society, joined the Airplane in the fall of 1966. Slick,  Dryden, male lead vocalist-guitarist-songwriter and founder of band Marty Balin, guitarist-vocalist-songwriter Paul Kantner, lead guitarist (and occasional vocalist) Jorma Kaukonen, and bassist Jack Casady formed the core of the best-known line-up of the group, which remained stable until Dryden's departure in early 1970.

Some controversy exists as to the role of Grateful Dead guitarist Jerry Garcia in the making of the album. His reputed presence on several tracks is denied by producer Rick Jarrard, but he is credited on the RCA label copy and received credits on the Flight Log compilation and the Jefferson Airplane Loves You box set. In the sleeve notes for Early Flight, a 1974 compilation album of previously unreleased material, manager Bill Thompson writes only that Garcia was "listed as 'spiritual advisor' on the album cover [and] played one of the guitars" on "In The Morning", a Kaukonen composition that was released on Early Flight and subsequently included on the 2003 reissue of Surrealistic Pillow. Garcia himself recalled in a mid-1967 interview that he played the high lead on "Today" in addition to playing guitar on two other songs ("Plastic Fantastic Lover" and "Comin' Back to Me") and rearranging "Somebody to Love". He also played on "J.P.P. McStep B. Blues" (included on Early Flight and the 2003 reissue) and may have played on "How Do You Feel". Kaukonen has opined that Garcia was essentially the producer who arranged the songs for the group. More recently, in his biography, he says, "I used to think about him as co-producer, but now that I really know what a producer is, the producer of that record was Rick Jarrard. Jerry was a combination arranger, musician, and sage counsel." A comment by Garcia about the music being "as surrealistic as a pillow is soft" also reportedly inspired the album title.

Production
Jefferson Airplane's fusion of folk rock and psychedelia was original at the time, in line with musical developments pioneered by the Byrds, the Beach Boys, the Mamas & the Papas, Bob Dylan, the Yardbirds, and the Beatles, among other mid-1960s rock bands. Surrealistic Pillow was the first blockbuster psychedelic album by a band from San Francisco, announcing to the world the active bohemian scene that had developed there starting with the Beats during the 1950s, extending and changing through the 1960s into the Haight-Ashbury counterculture. Subsequent exposure generated by the Airplane and others wrought great changes to that counterculture, and by 1968 the ensuing national media attention had precipitated a very different San Francisco scene than had existed in 1966. San Francisco photographer Herb Greene photographed the band for the album's cover art.

Release and reception

The album was originally released on LP record by RCA Victor in different stereo (LSP-3766) and mono (LPM-3766) editions. The stereo mixes include heavier use of reverberation effects than the mono. The mono version was deleted in the late 1960s and remained unavailable until 2001. The first United Kingdom release replaced some of the original songs with tracks from the group's first US LP, Jefferson Airplane Takes Off.

In 2003, the album was ranked number 146 on Rolling Stone magazine's list of the "500 Greatest Albums of All Time", maintaining the rating in a 2012 revised list, and dropping to number 471 in the 2020 revised list.  It was voted number 174 in Colin Larkin's All Time Top 1000 Albums.

In January 2017, "Somebody to Love" received a gold certification from the Recording Industry Association of America, while "White Rabbit" received a platinum certification.

Reissues
The first Compact Disc releases were in Japan in 1987 and the US in 1988. A 2001 re-issue by RCA was released as a limited edition gold CD and contained both the stereo and mono recordings. Both mixes were later included as part of the Ignition box set on a standard aluminum CD.

Another stereo reissue appeared on August 19, 2003, with six bonus tracks, including the mono A-sides of "Somebody to Love" and "White Rabbit". The 2003 reissue was produced by Bob Irwin.

Track listing

Original release

1967 UK release
Side one
"My Best Friend"	
"3/5 Of A Mile In 10 Seconds"	
"D.C.B.A. - 25"	
"How Do You Feel"	
"Embryonic Journey"	
"Don't Slip Away" (Balin, Spence)

Side two	
"Come Up The Years" (Balin, Kantner)
"Chauffeur Blues" (Lester Melrose)	
"Today"	
"Comin' Back To Me"	
"Somebody To Love"

Personnel
Jefferson Airplane
Marty Balin – vocals, guitar, album design, lead vocals on "Today", "Comin' Back to Me" and "Plastic Fantastic Lover", co-lead vocals on "She Has Funny Cars", "My Best Friend", "Go to Her" and "3/5 Of A Mile In 10 Seconds"
Jack Casady – bass guitar, fuzz bass, rhythm guitar
Spencer Dryden – drums, percussion
Paul Kantner – rhythm guitar, vocals, lead vocals on "How Do You Feel", co-lead vocals on "My Best Friend", "D. C. B. A.-25" and "Go to Her"
Jorma Kaukonen – lead guitar, lead vocals on "Come Back Baby", "In the Morning" and "Embryonic Journey"
Grace Slick – vocals, piano, organ, recorder, lead vocals on "Somebody to Love" and "White Rabbit", co-lead vocals on "She Has Funny Cars", "My Best Friend", "D. C. B. A.-25", "Go to Her" and "3/5 Of A Mile In 10 Seconds"
Signe Toly Anderson - lead vocals on "Chauffeur Blues" (UK only)
Skip Spence - drums on "Don't Slip Away", "Come Up the Years" and "Chauffeur Blues" (UK only)
Additional personnel
Jerry Garcia – "musical and spiritual advisor"; guitar on "Today", "Comin' Back to Me", "Plastic Fantastic Lover", "In the Morning", and "J. P. P. McStep B. Blues"
Herb Greene – photography
David Hassinger – engineer
Rick Jarrard – production

Charts
Album

Single

Certifications

References

Notes

Citations

External links

Surrealistic Pillow (Adobe Flash) at Radio Romania's Radio3Net (streamed copy where licensed)
Album entry at Jefferson Airplane's website

1967 albums
Albums produced by Rick Jarrard
Jefferson Airplane albums
RCA Victor albums